Burnsall is a village and civil parish in the Craven district of North Yorkshire, England. It is situated on the River Wharfe in Wharfedale, and is in the Yorkshire Dales National Park.

It has a parish church, a chapel, two hotels with restaurants, a public house, and a primary school. The school, Grade II listed, is in the original 1602 grammar school building, a legacy of William Craven of nearby Appletreewick. There is a five-arched bridge over which the Dalesway passes. A path along the river from Burnsall to Hebden,  to the north-west, dates to Viking times.

The historic parish of Burnsall occupied a large part of upper Wharfedale. It included the townships of Appletreewick, Bordley, Conistone with Kilnsey, Cracoe, Hartlington, Hetton, Rylstone and Thorpe, all of which became separate civil parishes in 1866. The parish was in Staincliffe Wapentake and in the West Riding of Yorkshire until 1974, when it was transferred to North Yorkshire. The 2001 Census gave Burnsall parish a population of 112, decreasing to 110 at the 2011 census.

The ecclesiastical parish of Burnsall is in the Diocese of Leeds. The parish church of St Wilfrid's, a Grade I listed building, is almost entirely Perpendicular. It contains an 11th-century font carved with bird and beasts, twelve Anglo-Saxon sculpture fragments and a 14th-century alabaster panel depicting the Adoration of the Magi. The church-yard is entered from the main road by a lychgate.

Burnsall is a centre for walking, trout fishing, picnics, and weddings. An annual feast day games in August includes amateur competitions, tug of war and fell races. The village cricket pitch is below Burnsall Fell and is half enclosed by the river.

References

External links

St Wilfrid's Church web site
Walk from Burnsall to Grassington

Villages in North Yorkshire
Civil parishes in North Yorkshire
Wharfedale
Craven District